United Methodist Church is a historic United Methodist church located at Lyme in Jefferson County, New York. It was built in 1882 and is a one-story, four by three bay wood-frame structure on a foundation of coursed limestone blocks.  The "L" shaped plan consists of the main body of the church with a perpendicular Sunday school wing and a square entrance tower.  The interior reflects the influence of the Akron plan.

It was listed on the National Register of Historic Places in 1990.

References

Churches on the National Register of Historic Places in New York (state)
United Methodist churches in New York (state)
Churches completed in 1882
19th-century Methodist church buildings in the United States
Churches in Jefferson County, New York
Akron Plan church buildings
National Register of Historic Places in Jefferson County, New York
1882 establishments in New York (state)